Ab Amiri (also Romanized as Āb Amīrī) is a village in Tashan-e Gharbi Rural District, Tashan District, Behbahan County, Khuzestan Province, Iran. At the 2006 census, its population was 811, in 156 families.

References 

Populated places in Behbahan County